Nowergup railway depot is a Transperth depot in the suburb of Nowergup, Western Australia

History
Nowergup depot was built to service the Transperth B-series electric multiple units that were ordered to operate service on the Joondalup line, It is owned by the Public Transport Authority and leased to EDi Rail / Alstom Transport as part of its contract to maintain the B-series trains. 

The depot was completed on 17 May 2004 and officially opened on 13 June 2004 by Premier Geoff Gallop and Planning & Infrastructure Minister Alannah MacTiernan. It was built at the end of a single track extension of the Joondalup line beyond its then terminus of Clarkson. The line has since been extended to Butler with the track duplicated.

The depot is currently the base for B-series electric multiple units that operate services on the Joondalup and Mandurah lines. It is capable of holding 47 of the 3-car trains.

References

Joondalup line
Railway workshops in Western Australia
Railway stations opened in 2004
2004 establishments in Australia